Azizur Rahman is an Indian Politician and member of Indian National Congress. He represented Bijnor (Assembly constituency) 06th Legislative Assembly of Uttar Pradesh 08th Legislative Assembly of Uttar Pradesh and 09th Legislative Assembly of Uttar Pradesh, in office from Mar. 1974 to Nov. 1989.

References 

Year of birth missing
Possibly living people
People from Bijnor
Indian National Congress politicians from Uttar Pradesh
Uttar Pradesh MLAs 1974–1977
Uttar Pradesh MLAs 1977–1980
Uttar Pradesh MLAs 1980–1985
Uttar Pradesh MLAs 1985–1989
People from Bijnor district